Truly Madly Deeply – Ultra Rare Tracks is a compilation album released by Australian pop duo Savage Garden on 14 April 1998, exclusively in Japan.

Background
As none of Savage Garden's first three singles were issued in Japan, Sony made the decision to instead release all of the remixes and B-sides included on the singles as a compilation album. Despite "Mine" being a B-side to "I Want You", it was not included on the compilation as it was made available as a bonus track on the Japanese version of the group's self-titled debut album. The album was later made widely available in the United Kingdom through HMV and Virgin, who sold copies of the album as imports in their UK stores. The song "All Around Me", although not released as a B-side, originally appeared on the Australian release of Savage Garden, but was removed when the album was released internationally, and thus, is included here as it had never previously been released in Japan. It later became available as the B-side to "The Animal Song" in several countries outside Australia.

Track listing
 "All Around Me" – 4:11
 "Truly Madly Deeply" (album version) – 4:38
 "Fire Inside the Man" – 4:24
 "I'll Bet He Was Cool" – 4:58
 "I Want You" (Xenomania Funky Mix) – 4:34
 "Love Can Move You" – 4:47
 "This Side of Me" – 4:11
 "Memories Are Designed to Fade" – 3:51
 "To the Moon and Back" (Hani's Num Radio Edit) – 3:57
 "Santa Monica" (Bittersweet Mix) – 5:00
 "Break Me Shake Me" (live acoustic) – 4:18
 "I Want You" (live acoustic) – 2:47
 "Truly Madly Deeply" (Dub mix) – 4:37
 "Truly Madly Deeply" (Australian version) – 4:37

References

External links
Truly Madly Deeply – Ultra Rare Tracks at Discogs

Savage Garden albums
B-side compilation albums
1998 compilation albums